Ig mu chain C region is a protein that in humans is encoded by the IGHM gene.

It is associated with agammaglobulinemia-1.

References

Further reading

Proteins
Antibodies